Geriojennsa is a monotypic moth genus in the subfamily Arctiinae erected by Watson, Fletcher and Nye in 1980. Its single species, Geriojennsa cunegunda, was first described by Schaus in 1924. It is found in Argentina.

References

Lithosiini